The United Kingdom of Great Britain and Northern Ireland competed as Great Britain at the 1984 Winter Olympics in Sarajevo, Yugoslavia.

Medallists

Alpine skiing

Men

Women

Biathlon

Men

Men's 4 x 7.5 km relay

 1 A penalty loop of 150 metres had to be skied per missed target.
 2 One minute added per missed target.

Bobsleigh

Cross-country skiing

Men

Men's 4 × 10 km relay

Women

Women's 4 × 5 km relay

Figure skating

Men

Women

Pairs

Ice Dancing

Luge

Men

Women

Speed skating

Men

References
Official Olympic Report (PDF)
International Olympic Committee results database
 Olympic Winter Games 1984, full results by sports-reference.com

Nations at the 1984 Winter Olympics
1984 Winter Olympics
Winter Olympics
Winter sports in the United Kingdom